The 1995 Algerian Super Cup is the  4th edition of Algerian Super Cup, a football match contested by the winners of the Championnat National and 1994–95 Algerian Cup competitions. The match was scheduled to be played on 31 August 1995 at Stade 5 Juillet 1962 in Algiers between 1994–95 Championnat National winners JS Kabylie and 1994–95 Algerian Cup winners CR Belouizdad.

Match details

References 

Algerian Super Cup
Football in Algeria